Gersh may refer to:

The Gersh Agency, a talent agency
Gersh College; see Daemen College

Surname
Darren Gersh, American journalist, PBS's Nightly Business Report
 Harry Gersh (1912-2001) American writer and historian
Squire Gersh (born 1913) American jazz tubist and double-bassist

Given name
Gersh Budker (1918–1977), Soviet nuclear physicist
Gersh Kuntzman, American journalist

See also
Gersz (disambiguation)
Qirsh
Georg (disambiguation)
George (disambiguation)